Blue Jay is an unincorporated community in Raleigh County, West Virginia, United States.  Blue Jay is southeast of Beckley. Its mines have yielded 1,587,229 tons of coal.

Notable person
 Basil Plumley (1920–2012), United States Army soldier portrayed by Sam Elliott in We Were Soldiers

References

Unincorporated communities in Raleigh County, West Virginia
Unincorporated communities in West Virginia
Coal towns in West Virginia